Takumi Kanaya (born 23 May 1998) is a Japanese professional golfer. He had an exceptionally successful amateur career and was world ranked number 1 in the World Amateur Golf Ranking for 55 weeks. He also won a professional event on the 2019 Japan Golf Tour while still an amateur.

Amateur career
Kanaya had a successful amateur career, winning the 2015 Japan Amateur Championship and the 2018 Asia-Pacific Amateur Championship. The latter gave him entry to the Masters and the Open Championship in 2019. He played in a number of representative matches, including the 2018 Eisenhower Trophy where he had the second best individual score. Kanaya won team gold medals at the 2017 Summer Universiade and at the 2018 Asian Games. He was world ranked number 1 in the World Amateur Golf Ranking for 55 weeks, winning the Mark H. McCormack Medal for 2020.

While still an amateur, Kanaya played in a number of professional tournaments. He was the runner-up in the 2017 Japan Open Golf Championship, a stroke behind Yuta Ikeda. He won the 2019 Mitsui Sumitomo Visa Taiheiyo Masters on the Japan Golf Tour and finished tied for 3rd place in the 2019 Emirates Australian Open.

Professional career
Kanaya turned professional in October 2020 and made his professional debut at the Japan Open Golf Championship, finishing in 7th place.

In November 2020, Kanaya won the Dunlop Phoenix Tournament. This was his second win in a professional tournament but his first since turning pro. The Dunlop Phoenix is regarded as one of the premier tournaments in Japan. The win moved him to 126th in the Official World Golf Ranking.

Amateur wins
2015 Japan High School Spring Championship, Japan Amateur Championship
2016 JHGA Spring Championship 15 - 17, Chugoku Amateur Championship
2018 Chugoku Amateur Championship, Asia-Pacific Amateur Championship

Source:

Professional wins (4)

Japan Golf Tour wins (3)

*Note: The 2021 Token Homemate Cup was shortened to 54 holes due to a positive COVID-19 test in the field.

Japan Golf Tour playoff record (1–0)

Asian Tour wins (1)

Results in major championships
Results not in chronological order in 2020.

"T" = Tied
CUT = missed the halfway cut
NT = No tournament due to COVID-19 pandemic

Results in World Golf Championships

1Cancelled due to the COVID-19 pandemic

QF, R16, R32, R64 = Round in which player lost in match play

NT = No tournament

Team appearances
Amateur
Nomura Cup (representing Japan): 2015 (winners), 2017
Bonallack Trophy (representing Asia/Pacific): 2016, 2018 (winners)
Eisenhower Trophy (representing Japan): 2016, 2018
Arnold Palmer Cup (representing International team): 2019 (winners)

References

External links

Japanese male golfers
Japan Golf Tour golfers
Universiade medalists in golf
Universiade gold medalists for Japan
Medalists at the 2017 Summer Universiade
Asian Games medalists in golf
Asian Games gold medalists for Japan
Medalists at the 2018 Asian Games
Golfers at the 2018 Asian Games
People from Kure, Hiroshima
Sportspeople from Hiroshima Prefecture
1998 births
Living people